Adriano Schmidt (born 9 May 1994), or also known as Bùi Đức Duy, is a professional footballer who plays as a centre-back for Topenland Bình Định. Born in Germany, he plays for the Vietnam national team.

International career
He made his debut for the Vietnam national football team on June 1, 2022 in a friendly match against Afghanistan.

Career statistics

International

Personal life
Schmidt has a Vietnamese father and a German mother. He was born and raised in Germany.

Honours
Topenland Binh Dinh
V.League 1 third place: 2022
Vietnamese Cup runner-up: 2022

See also
 List of Vietnam footballers born outside Vietnam

References

1994 births
Living people
People from Grimma
Footballers from Saxony
Vietnamese footballers
Vietnam international footballers
German footballers
Vietnamese people of German descent
German people of Vietnamese descent
Haiphong FC players
V.League 1 players
Sportspeople of Vietnamese descent
Association football central defenders
Vietnamese expatriate footballers